Alliance for Social-Liberal Progress (in Bulgarian: Алианс за социаллиберален прогрес) is a political party in Bulgaria. The party was founded on February 18, 2001, and registered on March 28.

The party is led by Vasil Velinov, formerly the president of the Alternative Social-Liberal Party. Other leading figures include Alei Mishkovski, Atanas Direkov and Jurij Aslanov.

The highest organ of the party is the congress. The congress elects a Political Council.

Liberal parties in Bulgaria
2001 establishments in Bulgaria
Political parties established in 2001